William Brady (born 1870) was a Scottish professional footballer who played as a forward.

Playing career
Brady was born in Renton, West Dunbartonshire. He played for Dundee Harp. He played for Burnley in the first season of The Football League, 1888–89.

During the 1892–93 season he played for Newton Heath. William Brady is credited in two separate match reports as playing instead of Billy Hood in a match against Derby County on 11 February 1893.

Notes and references

1870 births
Date of birth missing
Year of death missing
Scottish footballers
Association football forwards
Dundee Harp F.C. players
Burnley F.C. players
English Football League players
Manchester United F.C. players
Footballers from West Dunbartonshire
Renton F.C. players
Newcastle West End F.C. players
People from Renton, West Dunbartonshire